Chang Feng-chih is a retired Taiwanese male artistic gymnast and at the 1993 World Artistic Gymnastics Championships in Birmingham he won the silver medal in the Vault event finals. In so doing, he became the first athlete representing Taiwan to win a World Championships medal in Gymnastics.

References

Living people
Taiwanese male artistic gymnasts
Medalists at the World Artistic Gymnastics Championships
Year of birth missing (living people)